Georg Postl is an Austrian former cyclist. He won the Austrian National Road Race Championships in 1969 and 1970.

References

External links
 

Year of birth missing (living people)
Living people
Austrian male cyclists
People from Neunkirchen District, Austria
Sportspeople from Lower Austria